Emigration Canyon is the name of two canyons in the American mountain west:

 Emigration Canyon, Idaho
 Emigration Canyon, Utah